Joachim Ernest  may refer to:

 Joachim Ernest, Prince of Anhalt (1536–1586), German prince of the House of Ascania
 Joachim Ernest of Schleswig-Holstein-Sonderburg-Plön (1595–1671), first Duke of Schleswig-Holstein-Plön

See also

 Joachim Ernst, Duke of Anhalt
 Joachim (given name)